Prosvetno Delo is a publishing house from North Macedonia. The company was established by the decision of the Presidium of ASNOM on March 31, 1945.

Publications

All publication are in Macedonian

2010
 Albert Camus - The Stranger
2011
Edgar Allan Poe - Short Stories
2012
 Kalesh Angja - Stale Popov
2013
 Torment - Lauren Kate
2016
 Why do I curs? - Vedrana Rudan
2017
I want to read (Children's book)
Agata Mistery (Children's book)
The biggest revenge against everyone is happiness - Slavica Squire
Jump, jump over - Vasil Mukaetov
Thank you very much - Marko Vidojkovic
The waking of Odysseus - Dragi Mihajlovski
The smell of the sky - Isidora Bjelica
2018
 Girlfriends, Help - Isidora Bjelica and Jovana Hismajer
Football stars - Vladimir Novakovic

Other
Prosvetno Delo has also a chain of stores in North Macedonia. Besides publications it offers office supplies, children's magazines and school accessories.

References

1945 establishments in Yugoslavia
Culture in Skopje
Publishing companies established in 1945
Publishing companies of North Macedonia